John Adams Dix (July 24, 1798 – April 21, 1879) was an American politician and military officer who was Secretary of the Treasury, Governor of New York and Union major general during the Civil War. He was notable for arresting the pro-Southern Maryland General Assembly, preventing that divided border state from seceding, and for arranging a system for prisoner exchange via the Dix–Hill Cartel, concluded in partnership with Confederate Major General Daniel Harvey Hill.

Biography
Dix was born in Boscawen, New Hampshire on July 24 1798, the son of Timothy Dix and Abigail Wilkins, and brother of composer Marion Dix Sullivan. He was educated at Phillips Exeter Academy, and joined the US Army as an ensign in May 1813, serving under his father until the latter's death a few months later. He attained the rank of captain in August 1825 and resigned from the Army in December 1828.

In 1826, Dix married Catherine Morgan, the adopted daughter of Congressman John J. Morgan, who gave Dix a job overseeing his upstate New York land holdings in Cooperstown. Dix and his wife moved to Cooperstown in 1828, and he practiced law in addition to overseeing the land holdings. In 1830, he was appointed by Governor Enos T. Throop as Adjutant General of the New York State Militia, and moved to Albany, New York. He was Secretary of State of New York from 1833 to 1839, and a member of the New York State Assembly (Albany Co.) in 1842.

U.S. Senator

Dix was elected as a Democrat to the United States Senate to fill the vacancy caused by the resignation of Silas Wright, Jr., and held office from 1845 to 1849. In November 1848, he was the Barnburner/Free-Soil candidate for Governor of New York, but was defeated by Whig Hamilton Fish. In February 1849, he ran for re-election to the U.S. Senate as the Barnburners' candidate, but the Whig majority of the State Legislature elected William H. Seward.

Railroad president and postmaster

In 1853 Dix was president of the Mississippi and Missouri Railroad. He was appointed Postmaster of New York City and served from 1860 to 1861.

In addition to his military and public duties, Dix was the president of the Union Pacific from 1863 to 1868 during construction of the First transcontinental railroad. He was the figurehead for rail baron Thomas C. Durant, in both of his railroad presidencies. He was also briefly president of the Erie Railroad in 1872.

Civil War service

Dix was appointed United States Secretary of the Treasury by President James Buchanan in January 1861 for the remainder of the lame duck president's term, ending on March 4.  At the outbreak of the Civil War, he sent a telegram to the Treasury agents in New Orleans ordering that: "If any one attempts to haul down the American flag, shoot him on the spot."  Although the telegram was intercepted by Confederates, and was never delivered to the Treasury agents, the text found its way to the press, and Dix became one of the first heroes of the North during the Civil War. The saying is found on many Civil War tokens minted during the war, although the wording is slightly modified.

Major general

At the start of the American Civil War, Dix was appointed a major general in the New York Militia. With George Opdyke and Richard Milford Blatchford, he formed the Union Defense Committee, empowered by President Abraham Lincoln to spend public money during the initial raising and equipping of the Union Army.  He joined the Union Army as the highest ranking major general of volunteers during the war, effective May 16, 1861; also appointed on that day were Nathaniel P. Banks and Benjamin Franklin Butler, but Dix's name appeared first on the promotion list, meaning that he had seniority over all major generals of volunteers. In the summer of 1861, he commanded the Department of Maryland and the Department of Pennsylvania. His importance at the beginning of the Civil War was in arresting six members of the Maryland General Assembly and thereby preventing the legislature from meeting. This prevented Maryland from seceding, and earned him President Lincoln's gratitude. That winter, he commanded a regional organization known as "Dix's Command" within Maj. Gen. George B. McClellan's Department of the Potomac. Dix commanded the Department of Virginia from June 1862 until July 1863, and the Department of the East from July 1863 until April 1865.

On July 22, 1862, Dix and Confederate Major General Daniel Harvey Hill concluded an agreement for the general exchange of prisoners between the Union and Confederate armies. This agreement became known as the Dix-Hill Cartel. It established a scale of equivalents, where an officer would be exchanged for a fixed number of enlisted men, and also allowed for the parole of prisoners, who would undertake not to serve in a military capacity until officially exchanged. (The cartel worked well for a few months, but broke down when Confederates insisted on treating black prisoners as fugitive slaves and returning them to their previous owners.)

On October 10, 1862, Lincoln's Secretary of the Navy, Gideon Welles wrote that "a scheme for permits, special favors, Treasury agents, and improper management" existed and was arranged by Treasury Secretary Salmon P. Chase for General John A. Dix.  The motive of Chase appeared to be for political influence and not for financial gain.

Dix was considered too old for field command. Some believe that his most distinguished contribution to the war was the suppression of the New York City draft riots in July 1863, although the rioting had already subsided by the time he replaced General John E. Wool. He was also active in the defense of Suffolk, which was part of his department. He served as the temporary chairman of the 1866 National Union Convention.

Later career
He was United States Minister to France from 1866 to 1869.

He was Governor of New York from 1873 to 1874, elected on the Republican ticket in November 1872, but was defeated for re-election by Samuel J. Tilden in November 1874. He suffered another defeat when he ran for the Mayor of New York City in 1876.

Death 
Dix died in New York City at age 80 and was buried at the Trinity Church Cemetery in Lower Manhattan.

Legacy
His memoirs, contained in two volumes, were compiled by his son, Morgan Dix.
Fort Dix, New Jersey, a United States Army post, is named for Dix, as is Dix, Illinois, and also Dix Township, Ford County, Illinois, and several revenue cutters, John A. Dix.
Dix Mountain, one of the Adirondack High Peaks, was named for him. The name was later extended to its entire range.
There is a memorial to Dix at the Cathedral of All Saints (Albany, New York).

See also

List of American Civil War generals (Union)

Notes

References

Secondary sources
 Eicher, John H., and Eicher, David J., Civil War High Commands, Stanford University Press, 2001, .
Union Pacific Railroad, UP - History of the UP logo.  Retrieved June 8, 2005. Timeline that also includes UP presidency successions.
Warner, Ezra J., Generals in Blue: Lives of the Union Commanders, Louisiana State University Press, 1964, .

Primary sources
 Dix, Morgan (compiler).  Memoirs of John Adams Dix,  (1883). Vol. I Vol. II
 Dix, John Adams.  Speeches and Occasional Addresses.  Volume II (1864) online edition
 U.S. War Department, The War of the Rebellion: a Compilation of the Official Records of the Union and Confederate Armies, U.S. Government Printing Office, 1880–1901.

External links

 
 Likenesses of New Hampshire War Heroes & Personages
 Spartacus Educational: John A. Dix
 Mr. Lincoln and New York: John A. Dix 

|-

|-

|-

|-

|-

|-

|-

|-

1798 births
1879 deaths
19th-century American politicians
19th-century American diplomats
19th-century American railroad executives
Union Army generals
Union Pacific Railroad people
Erie Railroad
People from Boscawen, New Hampshire
Union (American Civil War) political leaders
Governors of New York (state)
United States Secretaries of the Treasury
Secretaries of State of New York (state)
People of New York (state) in the American Civil War
Phillips Exeter Academy alumni
Ambassadors of the United States to France
Canal executives
New York (state) Republicans
New York (state) lawyers
American Episcopalians
New York (state) Democrats
Democratic Party United States senators from New York (state)
Members of the New York State Assembly
Buchanan administration cabinet members
Republican Party governors of New York (state)
Postmasters of New York City
Burials at Trinity Church Cemetery